A Slight Case of Murder is a 1938 American comedy film directed by Lloyd Bacon. The film is based on the 1935 play by Damon Runyon and Howard Lindsay. The offbeat comedy stars Edward G. Robinson spoofing his own gangster image as Remy Marco.

Plot
With the end of Prohibition, bootlegger Remy Marco ("Marko" in a sequence of the film, and in the closed captioning) becomes a legitimate brewer; but he slowly goes broke because the beer he makes tastes terrible, and everyone is afraid to tell him so. After four years, with bank officers preparing to foreclose on the brewery, he retreats to his Saratoga summer home, only to find four dead mobsters who meant to ambush him, but were killed by their confederate whom they meant to betray. More and more problems begin to pop up in the life of the former bootlegger, as he has taken in a bratty orphan, and his daughter comes home with a fiancé that turns out to be a state trooper.

Marco solves the biggest problem by hiding the corpses in a closet and convincing the state trooper to "be a hero and shoot through the door". The trooper is hailed as a hero for capturing four desperate men single handed.

Cast

Critical response 
The movie continues to receive positive reviews. A Classic Film Guide review calls it "a satisfying comedy, which is enhanced by some great character work by veteran supporting players": Allen Jenkins, Edward Brophy, and Harold Huber as members of Remy's former gang gone legitimate; Margaret Hamilton as Mrs. Cagie, director of the orphanage where Marco grew up; and Paul Harvey as Marco's daughter's prospective father-in-law.

Adaptations
The story was remade as Stop, You're Killing Me (1952) with Broderick Crawford and Claire Trevor.

On April 8, 1945, Old Gold Comedy Theatre presented an adaptation of the film on NBC radio. The 30-minute program starred Edward G. Robinson and Allen Jenkins. On January 24, 1954, it was presented on NBC Star Playhouse starring Edward G. Robinson.

Although not an adaptation, Sylvester Stallone's movie Oscar (1991) bears a resemblance to the plot (minus the corpses), and all three movies can trace their ancestry to Molière's The Bourgeoise Gentleman.

See also
 List of American films of 1938

References

External links
 .
 
 
 

1938 films
1930s crime comedy films
American black-and-white films
American crime comedy films
American films based on plays
Films directed by Lloyd Bacon
Films produced by Samuel Bischoff
Films set in New York (state)
Warner Bros. films
1938 comedy films
1930s English-language films
1930s American films